Breton Island is an island (or group of islands) in the Gulf of Mexico near the mouth of the Mississippi River and part of Plaquemines Parish, Louisiana. It is part of the Breton National Wildlife Refuge, which was established in 1904.

Number of islands
In the early 19th century, Breton Island comprised two islands. Prior to Hurricane Opal in 1995, it was a single island, and was divided in two by that storm. After Hurricane Georges in 1998 it was divided into three islands. Hurricane Ivan in 2004 caused additional damage to the island.

Erosion and restoration
Some restoration was done in 1999 funded pursuant to the Water Resources Development Act of 1992; the project was put on hold in 2000. Fines from the Deepwater Horizon oil spill are being used for rebuilding Breton Island.

References

Islands of Louisiana
Landforms of Plaquemines Parish, Louisiana
Uninhabited islands of the United States